Abdulmajeed Obaid (born 4 November 1995) is a Saudi Arabian footballer who currently plays as a midfielder for Al-Kholood.

Career
On 11 August 2022, Obaid joined derby rivals Al-Qaisumah after spending 7 years at Al-Batin. On 4 September 2022, Obaid joined Al-Kholood

Honours
Al-Batin
MS League: 2019–20

References

External links
 

1995 births
Living people
Saudi Arabian footballers
Al Batin FC players
Al-Qaisumah FC players
Al-Kholood Club players
Saudi First Division League players
Saudi Professional League players
Association football midfielders